Arthur Robert Ashe Jr. (July 10, 1943 – February 6, 1993) was an American professional tennis player who won three Grand Slam singles titles. He started to play tennis at six years old. He was the first black player selected to the United States Davis Cup team, and the only black man ever to win the singles title at Wimbledon, the US Open, and the Australian Open. He retired in 1980. He was ranked world No. 1 by Rex Bellamy, Bud Collins, Judith Elian, Lance Tingay, World Tennis and Tennis Magazine (U.S.) in 1975. That year, Ashe was awarded the 'Martini and Rossi' Award, voted for by a panel of journalists, and the ATP Player of the Year award. In the ATP computer rankings, he peaked at No. 2 in May 1976.Ashe is believed to have acquired HIV from a blood transfusion he received during heart bypass surgery in 1983. He publicly announced his illness in April 1992, and began working to educate others about HIV and AIDS. He founded the Arthur Ashe Foundation for the Defeat of AIDS and the Arthur Ashe Institute for Urban Health before his death from AIDS-related pneumonia at the age of 49 on February 6, 1993. On June 20, 1993, he was posthumously awarded the Presidential Medal of Freedom by United States President Bill Clinton.

Biography

Early life

Arthur Ashe was born in Richmond, Virginia, to Arthur Ashe Sr. (d. 1989) and Mattie Cordell Cunningham Ashe on July 10, 1943. He had a brother, Johnnie, who was five years younger than he. The brothers were born into a family that claimed direct descent from Amar, a West African woman who was enslaved and brought to America in 1735 aboard a ship called The Doddington. Ashe family members were enslaved by North Carolina Governor Samuel Ashe.

In March 1950, Ashe's mother Mattie died from complications related to a toxemic pregnancy (now known as pre-eclampsia) at the age of 27. Ashe and his brother were raised by their father who worked as a handyman and salaried caretaker/Special Policeman for Richmond's recreation department.

Ashe Sr. was a caring father and strict disciplinarian who encouraged Arthur to excel both in school and in sports, but forbade him to play American football, a popular game for many boys, due to his son's slight build, something that meant Arthur's childhood nicknames were "Skinny" and "Bones". The Ashes lived in the caretaker's cottage in the grounds of 18-acre Brookfield park, Richmond's largest blacks-only public playground, which had basketball courts, four tennis courts, a pool, and three baseball diamonds. Ashe started playing tennis at seven years of age and began practicing on the courts where his natural talent was spotted by Virginia Union University student and part-time Brookfield tennis instructor Ron Charity, who as the best black tennis player in Richmond at the time began to teach Ashe the basic strokes and encouraged him to enter local tournaments.

Ashe attended Maggie L. Walker High School, where he continued to practice tennis. Ron Charity brought him to the attention of Robert Walter Johnson, a physician, and the coach of Althea Gibson, who founded and funded the Junior Development Program of the American Tennis Association (ATA). Ashe was coached and mentored by Johnson at his tennis summer-camp home in Lynchburg, Virginia, from 1953 when Ashe was aged 10, until 1960. Johnson helped fine-tune Ashe's game and taught him the importance of racial socialization through sportsmanship, etiquette, and the composure that would later become an Ashe hallmark. He was told to return every ball that landed within two inches of a line and never to argue with an umpire's decision. In 1958, Ashe became the first African American to play in the Maryland boys' championships. It was also his first integrated tennis competition.

In 1960, Ashe was precluded from competing against white youths in segregated Richmond during the school year, and unable to use the city's indoor courts that were closed to Black players. He accepted an offer from Richard Hudlin, a 62-year-old St. Louis teacher, tennis coach, and friend of Dr. Johnson, to move to St. Louis and spend his senior year attending Sumner High School, where he could compete more freely. Ashe lived with Hudlin and his family for the year, during which time Hudlin coached and encouraged him to develop the serve-and-volley game that Ashe's now-stronger physique allowed. Ashe was able to practice at the National Guard Armory indoor courts and in 1961, after lobbying by Dr. Johnson, was granted permission to compete in the previously segregated U.S. Interscholastic tournament and won it for the school.

In December 1960 and again in 1963, Ashe was featured in Sports Illustrated, appearing in their Faces in the Crowd segment. He became the first African American to win the National Junior Indoor tennis title.

He was awarded a tennis scholarship to the University of California, Los Angeles (UCLA) in 1963. During his time at UCLA, he was coached by J. D. Morgan and practiced regularly with his sporting idol, Pancho Gonzales, who lived nearby and helped hone his game. Ashe was also a member of the ROTC, which required him to enter active military service after graduation in exchange for money for tuition. He was active in other organizations, later pledging the Upsilon chapter of Kappa Alpha Psi Fraternity and becoming a member/brother of the fraternity.

After graduating with a bachelor's degree in Business Administration, Ashe joined the United States Army on August 4, 1966. Ashe completed his basic training in Washington and was later commissioned as a second lieutenant in the Adjutant General Corps. He was assigned to the United States Military Academy at West Point where he worked as a data processor. During his time at West Point, Ashe headed the academy's tennis program. He was temporarily promoted to 1st Lieutenant on February 23, 1968, and was discharged from the Army on February 22, 1969, as a 2nd Lieutenant. He was awarded the National Defense Service Medal for his service. He served a total of 2 years in the United States Army.

Career

1960's
In 1963, Ashe became the first black player ever selected for the United States Davis Cup team. In 1965, ranked the number 3 player in the United States, Ashe won both the National Collegiate Athletic Association (NCAA) singles title and the doubles title (with Ian Crookenden of New Zealand), helping UCLA win the team NCAA tennis championship.

In 1966 and 1967, Ashe reached the final of the Australian Championship but lost on both occasions to Roy Emerson.

In 1968 Ashe won the United States Amateur Championships against Davis Cup Teammate Bob Lutz, and the first US Open of the open era, becoming the first black male to capture the title and the only player to have won both the amateur and open national championships in the same year.

In order to maintain Davis Cup eligibility and have time away from army duty for important tournaments, Ashe was required to maintain his amateur status. Because of this, he could not accept the $14,000 first-prize money, which was instead given to runner-up Tom Okker, while Ashe received just $20 daily expenses for his historic triumph. His ability to compete in the championship (and avoid the Vietnam war) arose from his brother Johnnie's decision to serve an additional tour in Vietnam in Arthur's place.

In December 1968, Ashe helped the U.S. team become Davis Cup champions after victory in the final in Adelaide against defending champions, Australia. His only loss in the 12 Davis Cup tournament singles matches he played that year, was in the last dead rubber game after the U.S. team had already clinched victory. The season closed with Ashe the winner of 10 of 22 tournaments with a 72–10 win-loss match record.

In September 1969, the U.S. Davis Cup team retained the cup, beating Romania in the final challenge round, with Ashe winning both his singles matches. The same year, Ashe applied for a visa to play in the South African Open but was denied the visa by the South African government who enforced a strict apartheid policy of racial segregation.

He continued to apply for visas in the following years and the country continued to deny him one. In protest, he used this example of discrimination to campaign for U.S. sanctions against South Africa and the expulsion of the nation from the International Lawn Tennis Federation (ILTF) but, in defense of the individual South African players, refused the call from activists to forfeit matches against them.

1970's
In January 1970, Ashe won his second Grand Slam singles title at the Australian Open. With the competition somewhat depleted by the absence of some world-class National Tennis League (NTL) professional players barred by their league from entering because the financial guarantees were deemed too low, Ashe defeated Dick Crealy in straight sets in the final to become the first non-Australian to win the title since 1959.

In March 1970, triggered by South Africa's refusal to grant Ashe a visa to play there, the country was expelled from the Davis Cup competition for its racial policy. In September 1970, shortly after helping the U.S. Davis cup team defeat West Germany in the challenge round to win their third consecutive Davis Cup, Ashe signed a five-year contract with Lamar Hunt's World Championship Tennis.

In March 1971, Ashe reached the final of the Australian Open again but lost in straight sets to Ken Rosewall. In June that year, Ashe won the French Open men's doubles with partner Marty Riessen.

In 1972, due to a dispute between the ILTF and the WCT, Ashe, as one of the 32 contracted WCT players, was barred from taking part in any ILTF Grand Prix tennis circuit tournaments from January to July. This ban meant Ashe was unable to play at the French Open and Wimbledon Grand Slam tournaments.

In September, Ashe reached the final of the US Open for the second time. After leading his opponent, Ilie Năstase by 2 sets to 1 and with a break point to take a 4–1 lead in the fourth set, he eventually lost in five sets. The loss from such a winning position was the biggest disappointment of Ashe's professional tennis career. At the post-match award ceremony, irritated by some of Năstase's on-court antics during the game, Ashe praised Năstase as a tough opponent and 'colourful' player, then suggested, "... and when he brushes up on some of his court manners, he is going to be even better".

At this tournament, concerned that men's tennis professionals were not receiving winnings commensurate with the sport's growing popularity and to protect players from promoters and associations, Ashe supported the founding of the Association of Tennis Professionals. He went on to become its elected president in 1974.

In June 1973, as a result of an ATP boycott, Ashe was one of 13 seeded players and 81 players in total who withdrew from the Wimbledon tournament to much public criticism. The catalyst for the boycott was that Yugoslavian ATP member Niki Pilić had been suspended for nine months by his tennis federation after allegedly refusing to represent them in a Davis Cup tie against New Zealand in May, something Pilić denied.

The ban was upheld by the ILTF though they reduced it to just one month. The ATP contested the ban but lost a lawsuit to force Pilić's participation at Wimbledon during the ban period. As a member of the ATP board, Ashe voted to boycott the tournament, a vote that was only narrowly passed when ATP chairman, Cliff Drysdale abstained. Commentators considered that the boycott demonstrated the power of the fledgling ATP, and showed the tennis associations that professional players could no longer be dictated to.

In November 1973, with the South African government seeking to end their Olympic ban and re-join the Olympic movement, Ashe was finally granted a visa to enter the country for the first time, to play in the South African Open. He lost in the final to Jimmy Connors, but won the doubles with partner Tom Okker.

Despite boycotts against South African sport, Ashe believed that his presence could help break down stereotypes and that by competing and winning the tournament, it would stand as an example of the result of integration, and help bring about change in apartheid South Africa. He reached the singles final again in 1974, losing in straight sets to Connors for the second consecutive year.

In 1977, Ashe addressed a small crowd of boycott supporters at the U.S. Open and admitted that he had been wrong to participate in South Africa and once again supported the boycott of South African players after he had tried to purchase tickets for some young Africans for a tennis match in South Africa, and was told to use an "Africans only" counter. In the media, Ashe called for South Africa to be expelled from the professional tennis circuit and Davis Cup competition.

In May 1975, Ashe beat Björn Borg to win the season-ending championship WCT Finals in Dallas, Texas.  On July 5, 1975, in the first all-American Wimbledon final since 1947, Ashe, seeded sixth and just a few days short of his 32nd birthday, won Wimbledon at his ninth attempt, defeating the overwhelming favourite and defending champion, Jimmy Connors.

Ashe had never beaten Connors in any of their previous encounters and Connors had not dropped a set in any of the six earlier rounds, but Ashe played an almost perfect game of tactical tennis to win in four sets. In the lead-up to the final, the two players' relationship was already strained. Connors was suing the ATP, with Ashe as its president, for $10 million for alleged restraint of trade after opposition from the ATP and French officials meant he was refused entry to the 1974 French Open as a contracted member of World Team Tennis (WTT).

Just two days before the start of the Wimbledon tournament, it had been announced that Connors was now suing Ashe for $5 million for comments in a letter Ashe had written to ATP members in his role as president, criticizing Connors' insistence that Davis Cup captain Dennis Ralston should be fired and Connors' "unpatriotic" boycott of the competition which had started after Ralston left him out of the team against the West Indies in Jamaica in March 1972.

On the final day, Ashe pointedly and symbolically wore red, white and blue wristbands throughout the match and wore his U.S.A.-emblazoned Davis Cup warm-up jacket when walking out onto Centre Court and during the award ceremony while receiving the trophy and winner's cheque for GBP £10,000 (1975 equivalent US$23,000). Soon after the final, Connors dropped the libel suit.

Ashe played for a few more years and won the Australian Open doubles with Tony Roche in January 1977, but a left foot heel injury requiring surgery a month later and subsequent long-term rehabilitation saw his world ranking drop to a lowly 257th before a remarkable comeback saw him rise back to 13th in the world again the following year at the age of 35. However, after undergoing heart surgery in December 1979, Ashe officially retired on April 16, 1980, at the age of 36. His career record was 818 wins, 260 losses, and 51 titles.

Ashe remains the only Black man to win the singles title at Wimbledon, the US Open, or Australian Open. He is one of only two men of black African ancestry to win any Grand Slam singles title, the other being France's Yannick Noah, who won the French Open in 1983. He also led the United States to victory for three consecutive years (1968–70) in the Davis Cup.

In his 1979 autobiography, Jack Kramer, the long-time tennis promoter and a world no. 1 player himself in the 1940s, ranked Ashe as one of the 21 best players of all time.

Retirement and heart issues
After his retirement, Ashe took on many roles, including writing for Time magazine and The Washington Post, commentating for ABC Sports and HBO from the early 1980s until a few months before his death, founding the National Junior Tennis League, and serving as captain of the U.S. Davis Cup team from 1981 to 1985. He was elected to the International Tennis Hall of Fame in 1985.

In July 1979, at the age of 36, Ashe had suffered a heart attack while holding a tennis clinic in New York. In view of his high level of fitness as an athlete, his condition drew attention to the hereditary aspect of heart disease; his mother already had cardiovascular disease at the time of her death, aged 27, and his father had suffered a first heart attack, aged 55, and a second, aged 59, just a week before Ashe's own attack. Cardiac catheterization revealed one of Ashe's arteries was completely closed, another was 95 percent closed, and a third was closed 50 percent in two places. He underwent a quadruple bypass operation, performed by John Hutchinson on December 13, 1979.

A few months after the operation, Ashe was on the verge of making his return to professional tennis. However, during a family trip in Cairo, Egypt, he developed chest pains while running. He stopped running and returned to see a physician accompanied by his close friend Douglas Stein. Stein urged him to return to New York City so he could be close to his cardiologist, his surgeon and top-class medical facilities. In 1983, he underwent a second round of heart surgery to correct the previous bypass surgery. After the surgery, Ashe became national campaign chairman for the American Heart Association.

Civil Rights 
During this period, Ashe was an active civil rights supporter. He was a member of a delegation of 31 prominent African Americans who visited South Africa to observe political change in the country as it approached racial integration. He was arrested on January 11, 1985, for protesting outside the Embassy of South Africa, Washington, D.C., during an anti-apartheid rally. He was arrested again on September 9, 1992, outside the White House for protesting on the recent crackdown on Haitian refugees.

HIV diagnosis and later life 
In September 1988, Ashe was hospitalized after experiencing paralysis in his right arm. After undergoing exploratory brain surgery and a number of tests, doctors discovered that he had toxoplasmosis, a parasitic disease that is commonly found in people infected with HIV. A subsequent test later revealed that he was HIV positive. Ashe and his doctors believed he contracted the virus from blood transfusions he received during his second heart surgery. He and his wife decided to keep his illness private for the sake of their daughter, who was then two years old.

In 1988, Ashe published a three-volume book titled A Hard Road to Glory: A History of the African-American Athlete, after working with a team of researchers for nearly six years. Ashe stated that the book was more important than any tennis titles.

In 1992, a friend of Ashe who worked for USA Today heard that he was ill and called him to confirm the story. Ashe decided to preempt USA Todays plans to publish the story about his illness and, on April 8, 1992, publicly announced he had contracted HIV. He blamed USA Today for forcing him to go public with the news but also stated that he was relieved that he no longer had to lie about his illness. After the announcement, hundreds of readers called or wrote letters to USA Today criticizing their choice to run the story about Ashe that forced him to publicize his illness.

After Ashe went public with his illness, he founded the Arthur Ashe Foundation for the Defeat of AIDS, working to raise awareness about the virus and advocated teaching sex education and safe sex. He also fielded questions about his own diagnosis and attempted to clear up the misconception that only homosexual and bisexual men, or IV drug users were at risk for contracting HIV. In September 1992, he suffered a mild heart attack. In a speech to the United Nations General Assembly on World AIDS Day, December 1, 1992, he addressed the growing need for AIDS awareness and increased research funding, saying: "We want to be able to look back and say to all concerned that we did what we had to do, when we had to do it, and with all the resources required."

Two months before his death, he founded the Arthur Ashe Institute for Urban Health to help address issues of inadequate health care delivery and was named Sports Illustrated magazine's Sportsman of the Year. He also spent much of the last years of his life writing his memoir, Days of Grace, finishing the manuscript less than a week before his death.

Death
On February 6, 1993, Ashe died from AIDS-related pneumonia at New York Hospital at 3:13 p.m., at age 49. His funeral was held at the Arthur Ashe Athletic Center in Richmond, Virginia, on February 10. The governor Douglas Wilder, who was a friend of Ashe, allowed his body to lie in state at the Governor's Mansion in Richmond. More than 5,000 people lined up to walk past the casket. Andrew Young, who had performed the service for Ashe's wedding in 1977, officiated at his funeral. Over 6,000 mourners attended. Ashe requested that he be buried alongside his mother, Mattie, who died in 1950, in Woodland Cemetery in Richmond, Virginia.

On February 12, 1993, a memorial service for Ashe was held at the Cathedral of St. John the Divine in Manhattan. In Richmond, Virginia, where his statue by sculptor Paul DiPasquale is on Monument Avenue, his legacy lives on.

Personal life
In October 1976, Ashe met photographer and graphic artist Jeanne Moutoussamy at a United Negro College Fund benefit. Moutoussamy, who is of mixed Indo-Guadeloupean and African-American heritage, is the daughter of architect John Moutoussamy. On February 20, 1977, they were married in the Church Center for the United Nations in New York City in a ceremony officiated by Andrew Young, the United States Ambassador to the United Nations.

In December 1986, Ashe and Moutoussamy adopted a daughter they named Camera, after her mother's professional instrument.

Legacy

Awards and honors 

 In 1974, Ashe released one the sport's first instructional long-playing records, "Learn Tennis with Arthur Ashe. For Beginners and Advanced Players", co-produced by Richard B. Thompson.
In 1975, Ashe received the inaugural ATP Player of the Year Award.
In 1975 he received the BBC Overseas Sports Personality of the Year.
 In 1977, he received the ATP Sportsmanship Award, voted for by other ATP-tour players.
 In 1979, Ashe was awarded ATP Comeback Player of the Year and was inducted into the Virginia Sports Hall of Fame. Commenting on the induction, the Hall started: "Arthur Ashe was certainly a hero to people of all ages and races, and his legacy continues to touch the lives of many today. For Arthur Ashe, tennis was a means to an end. Although he had a lucrative tennis career, it was always more than personal glory and individual accolades. He used his status as an elite tennis player to speak out against the moral inequalities that existed both in and out of the tennis world. Ashe sincerely wanted to bring about change in the world. What made him stand out was that he became a world champion along the way."
 In 1982, The Arthur Ashe Athletic Center, a 6,000-seat multi-purpose arena, was built in Richmond, Virginia. It hosts local sporting events and concerts.
 Ashe was inducted into the Intercollegiate Tennis Association (ITA) Hall of Fame in 1983.
 In 1985, he was inducted into the International Tennis Hall of Fame.
 In 1986, Ashe won a Sports Emmy for co-writing the documentary A Hard Road to Glory, with Bryan Polivka.
 On December 3, 1992, Ashe was presented with the "Sports Legend" Award by the American Sportscasters Association at their Eighth annual Hall of Fame Awards Dinner in New York City.
 On June 20, 1993, Ashe was posthumously awarded the Presidential Medal of Freedom by President Bill Clinton.
 In 1993, Ashe was also awarded posthumously the Arthur Ashe Humanitarian of the Year Award by the ATP, in honour of his career-long contributions to humanitarianism.
 In 1993, Ashe received the Award for Greatest Public Service Benefiting the Disadvantaged, an award given out annually by Jefferson Awards.
 In 1996 the city of Richmond posthumously honored Ashe's life with a statue on Monument Avenue, a place traditionally reserved for statues of key figures of the Confederacy. This decision led to some controversy in a city that was the capital of the Confederate States during the American Civil War.
 The main stadium at the USTA National Tennis Center in Flushing Meadows Park, where the US Open is played, is named Arthur Ashe Stadium. This is also the home of the annual Arthur Ashe Kids' Day.
 In 2002, Ashe winning Wimbledon in 1975 was voted 95th in Channel 4's 100 Greatest Sporting Moments.
 In 2002, scholar Molefi Kete Asante listed Arthur Ashe on his list of 100 Greatest African Americans.
 In 2005, the United States Postal Service announced the release of an Arthur Ashe commemorative stamp, the first to feature a cover of Sports Illustrated magazine.
 Also in 2005, TENNIS Magazine ranked him 30th in their list of the 40 Greatest Players of the TENNIS Era.
 ESPN's annual sports awards, the ESPY Awards, hands out the Arthur Ashe for Courage Award to a member of the sports world who best exhibits courage in the face of adversity.
 Philadelphia's Arthur Ashe Youth Tennis and Education Center (now named Legacy Youth Tennis and Education Center) and Richmond's Arthur Ashe Athletic Center have been named for Ashe.
 The Arthur Ashe Student Health and Wellness Center at Ashe's alma mater, UCLA, is named for him. It opened in 1997.
 On June 22, 2019, the renaming of the Boulevard as Arthur Ashe Boulevard was celebrated in Richmond, Virginia.
 Diverse: Issues In Higher Education sponsors the Arthur Ashe Jr. Sports Scholar Awards to honor students of color who have excelled in the classroom as well as on the athletic field.

Grand Slam finals

Singles: 7 (3 titles, 4 runner-ups)

Doubles: 5 finals (2 titles, 3 runners-up)

Grand Slam singles performance timeline

1The Australian Open was held twice in 1977, in January and December.

Singles titles (76)
Note: Ashe won 28 titles before the Open Era

 * 44 Open Era titles listed by the ATP website

Notes

References

Bibliography

Further reading

External links

 Official Arthur Ashe Learning Center (AALC) website
 Official UCLA Arthur Ashe Legacy website
 
 
 
 
 Sports Illustrated Arthur Ashe tribute website
 Arthur Ashe Institute for Urban Health
 FBI files – Arthur Ashe is mentioned within six references of records maintained within FBIHQ main files concerning the Black Panther Party, the Student Nonviolent Coordinating Committee (SNCC), the Revolutionary Union and two newspaper articles.
 Arthur Ashe Youth Tennis and Education Manayunk, PA
 UCLA Arthur Ashe Student Health & Wellness Center
 
 
 Image of Arthur Ashe as a UCLA student firing a backhand volley at Dennis Ralston in the Southern California Intercollegiates, 1964. Los Angeles Times Photographic Archive (Collection 1429). UCLA Library Special Collections, Charles E. Young Research Library, University of California, Los Angeles.
 Interview with Arthur Ashe on KUT's "In Black America" radio series, September 8, 1988, at the American Archive of Public Broadcasting

1943 births
1993 deaths
African-American male tennis players
AIDS-related deaths in New York (state)
American color commentators
American male tennis players
20th-century American memoirists
Australian Open (tennis) champions
Deaths from pneumonia in New York City
French Open champions
Grand Slam (tennis) champions in men's doubles
Grand Slam (tennis) champions in men's singles
International Tennis Hall of Fame inductees
Pan American Games bronze medalists for the United States
Pan American Games gold medalists for the United States
Presidential Medal of Freedom recipients
Sportspeople from New York City
Sportspeople from Richmond, Virginia
Sumner High School (St. Louis) alumni
Tennis commentators
Tennis people from New York (state)
Tennis players from St. Louis
Tennis people from Virginia
Tennis players at the 1967 Pan American Games
UCLA Bruins men's tennis players
United States Army officers
US Open (tennis) champions
Wimbledon champions
United States Military Academy people
Army Black Knights men's tennis coaches
Pan American Games medalists in tennis
Maggie L. Walker Governor's School for Government and International Studies alumni
20th-century African-American sportspeople
World number 1 ranked male tennis players
Medalists at the 1967 Pan American Games